Moore-Kinard House, also known as the J.M.C. Kinard House, is a historic home located near Ninety Six, Greenwood County, South Carolina. It was built about 1835, and is a two-story, frame, antebellum central-hall farmhouse, or I-house.  Additions were made to the rear and one side of the house about 1900. Also on the property are the following contributing late-19th or early-20th century outbuildings: a smokehouse, cotton house, tool shed, ironing house, and well.

It was listed on the National Register of Historic Places in 1983.

References

Houses on the National Register of Historic Places in South Carolina
Houses completed in 1835
National Register of Historic Places in Greenwood County, South Carolina
Houses in Greenwood County, South Carolina